Paul Sykes (23 May 1946 – 7 March 2007) was a British heavyweight boxer, weightlifter, writer, prisoner, and debt collector. He spent much of his adult life in prison, where he became one of the UK's most notorious inmates. As a boxer he had success as an amateur in 1973, and in a brief professional career in 1979 fought John L. Gardner for the British and Commonwealth heavyweight titles.

Early life
Sykes was born 23 May 1946 in Wakefield, West Yorkshire to Walter Sykes and Betty Barlow. He grew up on the Lupset council estate and took up boxing at the age of 7 at the Robin Hood and Thorpe Amateur Boxing Club.

Sykes displayed considerable talent at an early age which, with his size and ability to move, made him formidable. However, he also began drinking heavily at a young age. When he was 16 he went to Germany to fight and the night before was carried out of a bar. Unsurprisingly, he lost.

His first prison sentence came at the age of 17. While in prison, in 1971, he sparred with Roger Tighe.

While serving a five-year sentence in HMP Walton, he was allowed to join the Maple Leaf Amateur Boxing Club in Bootle, run by a local magistrate, and was allowed out on licence to represent the North-Western Counties team in 1973, and was considered a potential ABA heavyweight champion, but lost in the semi-final of the championships that year to eventual winner Garfield McEwan.

After his release from prison in 1973, he worked as a lifeguard on Blackpool Beach.

Boxing career
Sykes's adult life was peppered with alcohol abuse, petty robberies, mental health issues, violent crime and prison. Nonetheless, during a brief period of rehabilitation, he fought ten bouts as a professional boxer between 1978 and 1980. On his release from prison in 1977, at the age of 30, having unsuccessfully applied for a professional licence in 1973, he applied again, but the BBBofC, wary of licensing a man who had spent so much of his adult life in prison, insisted that he wait six months before receiving a licence.

He finally made his professional debut in February 1978, beating Keith Steve Johnson via a first round retirement. In his second fight he challenged Neil Malpass for the BBBofC Central Area heavyweight title, losing via disqualification after he was judged to have deliberately head-butted Malpass in the seventh round. After wins over Tommy Kiely and Neville Meade, he again challenged Malpass for the Central Area title, in July 1978, the fight ended in a draw. In his sixth fight, Sykes knocked American David Wilson unconscious and continued to hit him relentlessly as he draped over the ropes, before the referee managed to pull him away. Wilson suffered a brain haemorrhage, was put on a life support machine and needed a month in hospital to recover.

Sykes' career peaked in June 1979 when he challenged for John L. Gardner's British and Commonwealth titles at Wembley. Sykes prepared for the fight with three weeks of sparring with Leon Spinks in Michigan. This proved to be an evenly matched contest as it entered the sixth round, though the younger Gardner's stamina proved too much for the 33-year-old Sykes, and the fight was stopped when Sykes turned his back, clearly overwhelmed by Gardner's onslaught. Gardner was seven years younger than Sykes (Gardner referred to Sykes after the fight as "an old man"), and this was his thirty-first professional fight; in contrast, Sykes had entered the fight after just eight professional bouts. Sykes still holds the record for being the British Heavyweight title challenger with fewest professional fights, having effectively been fast tracked by people involved with the sport who had been convinced of his potential. Despite many years in prison, such was the level of interest that Sykes generated on starting his belated boxing career following his release in 1978, that he found himself in promotional photographs with Don King and Larry Holmes, and also travelled to the United States to stand in as a sparring partner for Leon Spinks. Sykes was a bodyguard to Alex Steene, and sparred the future champion David Pearce, Paul Sykes said; David "Bomber" Pearce was the toughest and most ferocious fighter he faced during his boxing career based on the sparring that took place at the Waterloo Boxing Gym. Sykes, became good friends with Pearce and the Pearce boxing brothers. 
Sykes' manager, the highly respected Tommy Miller later said, "Paul could have gone right to the top, quite easily .. he impressed everybody", but "he was always in trouble one way or another, he'd always loads of worry on his mind." Sykes said of his ring career: "Boxing has been my salvation. It's the only sport which could have rescued me from my background."

His 'big chance' lost, Sykes was clearly demoralized and his professional career ended in March 1980 when Nigerian heavyweight Ngozika Ekwelum knocked him out in the first round of a fight in Lagos, Nigeria.

It appeared that Sykes had been billed to fight Lenny McLean at London's Rainbow Theatre on 20 November 1979, but this fight never materialised. Lenny Mclean, in his autobiography, later explained: "A week before the off, Sykes went into a club in Wakefield where he lives, got well pissed and had a ruck with four doormen. He did them all but one of them got lucky and put a cut above his eye that took eight stitches to pull together".

Sykes was jailed for five years in 1981 for taking out a contract on a union official from Blackpool. While in prison, he set records for lifting weights. An incredibly strong man, he was the holder of the British amateur squat weightlifting record (deep knee bend 500 lbs).

Prison
Sykes was classed as one of the most difficult prisoners in the UK throughout the 1970s and 1980s. By 1990, he had spent 21 out of 26 years in 18 prisons for many violent acts against prison officers and police officers. Sykes committed violent offences all over the North of England and was very well known to locals and the police in Leeds, Liverpool, Blackpool, Hull, and Rotherham. Sykes was also known and respected by the hard cases in London, possibly as a result of Sykes having trained alongside and sparred with such notorious criminals as Roy Shaw during his lengthy prison career. Some apparently classed Paul Sykes as one of the toughest men in Great Britain during the 1980s.

Paul Sykes is mentioned in the book, Legends by Charles Bronson, an A to Z guide of the men Bronson had regarded to be the toughest in Britain. Referring to him as 'Sykesy', Bronson describes him as "a legend, born and bred" and writes: "I first met Sykes in Liverpool in the early 70s and at that time he was probably the fittest con in Britain. A hard man from Yorkshire, a fighting man in every sense. A lot of people never liked him, perhaps they even feared him but I respected the man for what he stood for". Bronson then goes on to relate an incident said to have taken place in HMP Liverpool, when Sykes allegedly killed the prison's cat and fashioned it into a 'Davey Crockett' hat.

While in prison, Sykes earned a BA degree in Physical Sciences from the Open University and wrote a memoir, Sweet Agony, which won the Arthur Koestler Award for prison literature.

Later Years
Following his release from HM Prison Hull in 1990, producer Roger Greenwood followed him in the course of filming the documentary Paul Sykes: At Large. Greenwood described Sykes as "a fascinating character and incredibly intelligent".

A further documentary explored Sykes's brief post-release career as a debt collector, a business venture he dubbed the 'Last Resort Debt Collecting Agency... "threatenergrams" a speciality', and which was utilised by Wakefield businessman, Dennis Flint, who sent Sykes to collect debts in Spain in addition to funding his autobiography, 'Sweet Agony'.

Sykes could not control his drinking, his life began to crumble and he became a notorious character in the city of Wakefield.
In 2000, Wakefield Council secured a two-year ASBO banning him from the city centre after a string of aggressive drunken incidents including shouting abuse and urinating in public.

He was arrested in August 2003 for violating the ban by making an appointment with an optician in Wakefield, but was released on his own recognisance.

Death
Sykes died on 7 March 2007 at Pinderfields Hospital, Wakefield. His cause of death was noted as pneumonia and liver cirrhosis. His death certificate states his occupation as 'author (retired)' and the funeral service was held at Wakefield Baptist Church, which he regularly attended. He is buried in the Alverthorpe cemetery Wakefield

Children
Paul Sykes has two children who are both serving life sentences for murder. Paul Leighton Sykes is serving a life sentence for stabbing Michael Gallagher to death in a frenzied knife attack at his flat in Lupset, Wakefield in June 2004. In 2008, 25-year-old Michael Sharp became the second son of Paul Sykes to be jailed for murder, when he was given a minimum 27-year sentence at Leeds Crown Court for killing 38-year-old David Ward, a former police officer, following a botched armed robbery at his home on Denby Dale Road in Wakefield.

Books and film
Jamie Boyle wrote two books about Sykes, which were published in 2017. Boyle released a third book in 2020 to finish the series.  The film rights to these and Sykes' book were acquired in 2017 by Western Edge Pictures, and as of 2019 the film is still in development.

Professional boxing record

Published works
Sweet Agony (1988), Lofthouse Publications,

Biographies of Sykes
Boyle, Jamie (2017) Sykes: Unfinished Agony, Warcry Press, 
Boyle, Jamie (2017) Further Agony: One More Round with Sykes, Warcry Press, 
Brenton, Rob (2018) ''It's...Sharks: Paul Sykes & The Straits of Johor, Warcry Press,

Awards
1988: Koestler Award, Sweet Agony

References

External links

Alumni of the Open University
English male boxers
English criminals
Heavyweight boxers
Sportspeople from Wakefield
Sportspeople convicted of crimes
1946 births
2007 deaths
Criminals from Yorkshire